Good Morning Ulster is the flagship Northern Irish radio breakfast programme broadcast on BBC Radio Ulster.

The main presenting team is Sarah Brett and Chris Buckler: this core team is augmented with Joel Taggart, Mark Devenport, Declan Harvey and Jayne McCormack.

The programme is broadcast live each weekday between 6:30am and 9am from Studio 4 at the BBC's Broadcasting House in Belfast. Unlike the other main studios at Broadcasting House, Studio 4 sits within the newsroom itself.

In November 2019 Noel Thompson and Karen Patterson both announced they would be stepping down from Good Morning Ulster, effective from January 2020.

It is often cited as one of the most listened to breakfast radio programmes in Northern Ireland.

Regular features
Business (with Sara Neil)
Sport
Weather
Thought For The Day
Farming News (with Elaine Mitchell)

Previous presenters
Wendy Austin
Seamus McKee
Declan Lawn
Mark Carruthers
Mike Nesbitt
Barry Cowan
Karen Patterson
Noel Thompson

References

External links
Official website

Radio programmes in Northern Ireland
BBC Radio Ulster programmes
British radio breakfast shows